Nalî, also known as Mallah Xidir Ehmed Şawaysî Mîkayalî (1800 Shahrizor - 1856 in Constantinople), was born in Khakoo Khol, a village of Sulaymani province. He was a Kurdish poet and translator, who is considered to be one of the greatest Kurdish poets in the Kurdish classical period mainly because of his contribution to the Sorani school of poetry.

Early life and career

Nali was born in Khaku-Khol, a village belongs to Sharazur in Sulaimany, Kurdistan region of Iraq. As was the custom in the old days in Kurdistan, he started studying the Quran first and Arabic language in mosques in Kurdistan, then he became a Faqi. “Faqi" is a Mullah’s student, which is the name of students in mosques. During the process of becoming a Faqi, he visited many cities in the whole of Kurdistan or Iran and Iraq, cities like; Sennah, Mahabad, Halabja, and Sulaimany. In Qaradakh he studied under Shaikh Muhammed Ibin al Khayat, in Sulaimany in Saiyd Hasan Mosque, he studied under Mullah Abdoullah Rash, also in Qaradax he studied mathematics under Shaikh Ali Mullah. He spent long time in the Khanaqa of Mawlana Khalid in Sulaimany. He also studied under Shaikh Awla Kharpani.

Nali’s birth and death years
There are doubts about his birth year; Muhammed Amin Zaki Bag said that (Nali lived during 1215-1273 with Islamic year) this date is about 1800–1856. Dr. Marif Khaznadar and Dr. Kamal Foad both point to the same date too, but Aladdin Sajadi says that he was born in 1797 and died in 1855.

In a modern lecture about Nali’s death; Many people who lived during Nali’s period talked about Nali, Alexander Hodiszkov (1804–1891) was a Russian empire diplomat in 1857, he published an oration in Asia Magazine, with name ; “A Philological Research about Kurdish language”  he mentioned that; (A Kurdish great scientist lives in Damascus in Syria now, his name is Molla Hezir but he is most famous by his pseudonym as “Naeli Effendi” this man spent a lot of time for studying his country's dialects and language, he also translated an Arabic grammatical book to Kurdish, Ahmed Khan (Ahmed Pashay Baban – The King of Baban) who is Nali's friend promised me to introduce me to his country's greatest linguistic scientist).

In Nazhat al Fikr a historical book  says that, he mentioned (Al Shaikh Khidir Affandi Nali al Kurdi; was born in South Kurdistan in Shârazûr. He embarked on studies under the tutelage of renowned scholars and mastering many disciplines from the religious disciplines, mathematics, and others - especially in linguistics. In the year of twelve eighty something he came to Mecca he became our president's friend the Sheriff Abdoullah Pasha Bin On...  he has a great experience in Arabic literature...) these two references refuse Nali's death day in 1855 or 1858, in Nazhat al Fikr the year (In the year of twelve eighteen something 128-)  we can consider it from 1280-1289 is about 1863-1873.

In the Muhammed Tahir Borsali’s book (Otmanli Mualifleri) talks about Nali’s return from Hijaz or Saudi Arabia to Istanbul, he mentioned that Nali was return in 1290 that means 1873.

Even before finding these books the researchers doubted Nali’s year death, 1856.

Nali’s Pen Name
The name of Nalî is word going back to the Sanskrit, a proto-Indo-European root or 'nala' or 'nalika' that is a 'species of reed, 'nali' wind instrument, which in modern Kurdish refer to a Kurdish folk musical instrument, similar to a type of flute called Shimshal; as well as pencils which traditionally were made of reed. Clearly, this reveals two important aspects of both the pseudonym and the Kurdish language. One is that the Kurdish language has a cognate as deep-rooted and antiquated as Sanskrit. The other is that this particular pseudonym was apellated to him for his poetry and literary skills to enchant his listeners like a reed player as the wind instruments are considered to be ecstatic.

Nali and his Lover

Nali had a lover, he mentioned her name in more than eight poems, and he mentioned her name as (Habiba) (حبيبة ), Aladdin Sajadi mention that in Qaradax Nali had another lover her name was Aisha, this (Aisha)(عائشة) was always proud of herself because she was Nali’s lover, even Shaikh Nuri Baba Ali mentions this subject too that he says he met her alive. But still now there is not any sign or word in whole Nali’s poems for this (Aisha).

Many times Nali mentioned Habiba’s name, but sometimes he mentions her name as (Mahbuba) too. But there are big doubts in the real name of this woman, both of Aladdin Sajadi in his book (History of Kurdish Literature; Mêjûy edebî kurdî) and in (Diwani Nali) Abdul Karim Mudarris and his son they mentioned this doubt. The reason is Nali’s period a “Mullah” was a village’s leader or peoples’ leader he couldn't mention somebody's name in public because of costume traditional this was hard for a Mullah. Habiba was a secret name Nali used it. Sometimes Nali talks about their nights together; A Mullah couldn't talk about his night with a girl or a woman in a village or in those small old cities in Kurdistan. Here are some of Nali's poems that mentioned Habiba's name:

 Cenanî wek cînan kirdim be Mawa, Hebîbey Malîyawa malî awa
 Xendew demî Mehbube kewa zor nimekîn, Bes xoşe eger xo nimekî zexmu birînin
 Pêm delên Mehbube xêlu qîçe meylî şer deka, Xêlu qîçe ya tirazuy nazî nextê ser deka?

Some say that Nali married Habiba, but if were true, there is not any sign that Nali took Habiba to Hijaz, Damascus, or Istanbul. Aladdin Sajadi mentions that Habiba may have died before Nali's left for Hijaz. Also they didn't have any children. For explanation Aladdin Sajadi brings one of Nali's poems which talks about his losing friends:

Significance in Kurdish Culture
Along with Kurdi and Salim, Nali made Sorani the literary language of southern Kurdistan. It is widely accepted that Nali's literature contributed significantly to bringing about a renaissance in the Kurdish language. His most famous works were written in the lower Kurmanji dialect, Sorani, within the context of the turmoil caused by the Ottoman oppression. To this day Nali's influence on Kurdish culture can be recognized as Sorani is the primary dialect of Kurdish in Iraqi and Iranian Kurdistan.

References

External links
Dîwanî Nalî. Researched and explained by Abdul Karim Mudarris and Fatih Abdoulkarim. 
 Keith Hitchins, "NALÎ" in Encyclopædia Iranica, online edition.
Mystical Love and Mystical Nationalism in Farhad Shakely's String
Classic and Modern Kurdish Poetry

Iraqi Kurdish poets
Kurdish people from the Ottoman Empire
19th-century poets from the Ottoman Empire
1800 births
1877 deaths
Kurdish scholars
Kurdish scientists
Iraqi multilingual poets
19th-century Kurdish people